Xyphus is a role-playing video game first released in 1984. The game was designed by Skip Waller and Dave Albert, with a Macintosh version by Bob Hardy, for Penguin Software. It was the first RPG on Macintosh. It had upgraded graphics and a mouse friendly user-interface. Xyphus is pronounced, Eks-see-foose, and is the Greek word for sword.

Plot
The game takes place in the world of Arroya 10,000 years after the demon lord Xyphus was defeated, but not killed. His heart had been ripped out and magic amulets sprang from drops of his blood becoming the source of all magic in Arroya. The land became forbidden to human kind for monsters and dangerous creatures of all kinds inhabit Arroya. But a great leader, Das, has arisen and vows to bring civilization back to Arroya. This can only be accomplished by a small band of mercenary troops recruited from the races of humans, elves, and dwarves. As told in song only this band can destroy Xyphus, for as long as Xyphus lives, his minions shall roam and no peace will ever reign over the lands of Arroya.

Gameplay

The game begins with the creation of a party of four characters a mix of Humans, Dwarves, Elves, fighters and magic-users. These four adventurers must then explore the lands of Arroya battling a plethora of monsters; which include various races of goblins, various lycanthropes, giant slugs, anthrodons, various demons and villainous leaders such as the tribal shaman Erse, the orcish hetman, the Demon Prince Erranugh and a vampire. Through these battles the adventurers gain gold and experience points which they can use to upgrade and purchase new magic, weapons and armour as they go. The characters need to gather Xiphoid amulets to cast magic spells and visit forts or trading posts in order to heal, level-up and/or purchase new items. The game consists of 6 scenarios including the final one where your adventurers head underground to face the Demon Lord Xyphus, himself.

References

External links

Review in GAMES Magazine

Role-playing video games
Apple II games
Commodore 64 games
Classic Mac OS games
1984 video games
Video games developed in the United States
Penguin Software games
Single-player video games